Matzikama Local Municipality is a local municipality which governs the northernmost part of the Western Cape province of South Africa, including the towns of Vredendal, Vanrhynsdorp, Klawer and Lutzville, and the surrounding villages and rural areas.  it had a population of 67,147. It forms part of the West Coast District Municipality, and has municipality code WC011.

Matzikamma is of Khoikhoi origin, the first people of South Africa. It contains the Khoikhoi language words ma which means "give", tsî for "you", and kamma, which is ǁgamma and means "water", and loosely translates into "you that give water".

Geography
The Olifants River flows through the southern part of the municipal area, while to the north lies the hilly area known as the Knersvlakte. The municipality abuts on the Kamiesberg Municipality to the north, the Hantam Municipality to the east and the Cederberg Municipality to the south.

According to the 2011 census the municipality has a population of 67,147 people in 18,835 households. Of this population, 74.7% describe themselves as "Coloured", 14.8% as "White", and 8.5% as "Black African". The first language of 91.8% of the population is Afrikaans, while 3.5% speak Xhosa and 1.8% speak English.

The principal town and seat of the council is Vredendal, which is situated in the valley of the Olifants River and has a population (according to the 2011 census) of 18,170. Other large towns in the municipality are Klawer (pop. 6,234) situated upstream from Vredendal, Lutzville (pop. 5,232) situated downstream from Vredendal, and Vanrhynsdorp (pop. 6,272) to the north-east towards the escarpment. In the Olifants River valley there are also smaller agricultural settlements at Ebenhaeser (pop. 1,305) and Koekenaap (pop. 1,551). South of the mouth of the Olifants River are the coastal villages of Doringbaai (pop. 1,260) and Strandfontein (pop. 431). The villages of Bitterfontein (pop. 986), Kliprand (pop. 205), Nuwerus (pop. 650) and Rietpoort (pop. 970) are situated in the sparsely-populated Knersvlakte in the northern part of the municipality.

History
At the end of the apartheid era, in the area that is today Matzikama, there were municipal councils for the towns of Vredendal, Klawer, Lutzville, Vanrhynsdorp and Bitterfontein, and a local council for the villages of Doringbaai and Strandfontein known as the Louis Rood Local Council. These councils were elected by the white residents. The coloured residents of Vredendal, Klawer, Lutzville, Vanrhynsdorp, Koekenaap, Bitterfontein and Nuwerus were governed by management committees subordinate to the white councils. The former mission stations of Ebenhaeser and Rietpoort were governed by management boards, and the remaining rural areas fell under the West Coast Regional Services Council.

While the negotiations to end apartheid were taking place a process was established for local authorities to negotiate voluntary mergers. Several towns in the Matzikama region took part in this process, resulting in each municipal council merging with its corresponding management committee: Klawer in September 1992, Vanrhynsdorp in December 1992, Vredendal in January 1993, and Lutzville in January 1994.

After the national elections of 1994 a process of local government transformation began, in which negotiations were held between the existing local authorities, political parties, and local community organisations. As a result of these negotiations, the existing local authorities were dissolved and transitional local councils (TLCs) were created for each town and village. In total eight TLCs were created.
 The Vanrhynsdorp TLC replaced the (merged) Vanrhynsdorp Municipality in December 1994.
 The Vredendal TLC replaced the (merged) Vredendal Municipality in December 1994.
 The Klawer TLC replaced the (merged) Klawer Municipality in January 1995.
 The Doringbaai/Strandfontein TLC replaced the Louis Rood Local Council in January 1995.
 The Ebenhaeser TLC replaced the Ebenhaeser Management Board in January 1995.
 The Lutzville TLC replaced the (merged) Lutzville Municipality as well as the Koekenaap Management Committee in February 1995.
 The Bitterfontein/Nuwerus TLC replaced the Bitterfontein Municipality, the Bitterfontein Management Committee and the Nuwerus Management Committee in February 1995.
 The Rietpoort TLC replaced the Rietpoort Management Board in May 1995.
The transitional councils were initially made up of members nominated by the various parties to the negotiations, until May 1996 when elections were held. At these elections the West Coast District Council was established, replacing the West Coast Regional Services Council. Transitional representative councils (TRCs) were also elected to represent rural areas outside the TLCs on the District Council; the area that was to become Matzikama was covered by the Vredendal and Vanrhynsdorp TRCs.

At the local elections of December 2000 the TLCs and TRCs were dissolved. The Matzikama Municipality was established, though in 2000 it incorporated only the southern half of the area it governs today. That area included Vredendal, Vanrhynsdorp, Klawer, Lutzville, Ebenhaeser and Doringbaai/Strandfontein. The sparsely populated northern area, including Bitterfontein/Nuwerus and Rietpoort, became a District Management Area of the West Coast District Municipality. In 2011 this area was incorporated into the Matzikama Municipality when District Management Areas were abolished.

Politics

The municipal council consists of fifteen members elected by mixed-member proportional representation. Eight councillors are elected by first-past-the-post voting in eight wards, while the remaining seven are chosen from party lists so that the total number of party representatives is proportional to the number of votes received. In the election of 1 November 2021 the Democratic Alliance (DA) won a plurality of seats on the council.

The following table shows the results of the 2021 election.

In August 2020, the Hawks began investigating corruption in the municipality.

In August 2021, the Matzikama Local Municipality was flagged as one of the four Western Cape municipalities owing millions of rands to Eskom

By-elections from November 2021 
The following by-elections were held to fill vacant ward seats in the period since November 2021.

After the by-election, the council was reconfigured as below:

References

External links
 Official website
 Matzikama Local Municipality on the Western Cape Government website

Local municipalities of the West Coast District Municipality
Matzikama Local Municipality